In set theory, a supercompact cardinal is a type of large cardinal.  They display a variety of reflection properties.

Formal definition

If λ is any ordinal, κ is λ-supercompact means that there exists an elementary embedding j from the universe V into a transitive inner model M with critical point κ, j(κ)>λ and

That is, M contains all of its λ-sequences.  Then κ is supercompact means that it is λ-supercompact for all ordinals λ.

Alternatively, an uncountable cardinal κ is supercompact if for every A such that |A| ≥ κ there exists a normal measure over [A]< κ, in the following sense.

[A]< κ is defined as follows:

Here "constant on a set in U" means that there is  such that .

Properties
Supercompact cardinals have reflection properties. If a cardinal with some property (say a 3-huge cardinal) that is witnessed by a structure of limited rank exists above a supercompact cardinal κ, then a cardinal with that property exists below κ. For example, if κ is supercompact and the generalized continuum hypothesis (GCH) holds below κ then it holds everywhere because a bijection between the powerset of ν and a cardinal at least ν++ would be a witness of limited rank for the failure of GCH at ν so it would also have to exist below κ.

Finding a canonical inner model for supercompact cardinals is one of the major problems of inner model theory.

The least supercompact cardinal is the least  such that for every structure , with cardinality of the domain , and for every  sentence  such that , there exists an elementary substructure  with smaller domain.

See also
 Indestructibility
 Strongly compact cardinal
 List of large cardinal properties

References

Citations

Large cardinals